Radio Garden is a non-profit Dutch radio and digital research project developed from 2013 to 2016, by the Netherlands Institute for Sound and Vision (under the supervision of Martin Luther University of Halle-Wittenberg's Golo Föllmer), by the Transnational Radio Knowledge Platform and five other European universities. According to the service, the idea is to narrow the boundaries from the radio.
It gained popularity in 2016 when it surpassed the 8,000 registered station mark and, as announced at The Radio Conference 2016: Transnational Encounters, went viral.

Operation and  functionality
The site interface is a three-dimensional geolocation, where the user navigates through a representation of the globe, listening to broadcasts of local radio stations, referring in some way to the technology of shortwave radios, long distances, but in this case the means of propagation of the radio edition is by data packets (streaming).
The homepage, titled Live, allows the user to explore the world in real time, listening to what the local radios are broadcasting. To do this, it is just necessary to simply rotate the globe. It also provides information on the country where the signal is being transmitted.

Concept and design
Within Radio Garden, radios are arranged by geolocation and grouped by cities. According to specialized websites, the design is formed by greenish spheres superimposed on the map, which increases in size as the region's number of broadcasters available.
This idea was developed by the companies Studio Puckey and Studio Moniker in partnership with the Netherlands Institute for Sound and Vision. 
Radios are available at locations such as Aleppo, Havana, Sri Lanka, London, South Korea, in addition to New York, Lisbon, Kyiv etc.

On 14 March 2020 a new version, with upgraded features, was released.

Interface and conversion
The site adopted the generic .garden Top-level domain, which was originally intended for gardening professionals and, as noted on specialized websites, the interface is all responsive and fits any browser and resolution. 
For transmission, the signal generated by the broadcaster must be converted from radio to streaming editing. The service requires an Internet connection to function. Supported conversion formats for streaming are MP3, Ogg and AAC.

Blocking of Radio Garden
Radio Garden has been banned in Turkey since January 2022 upon the request of Radio and Television Supreme Council (RTÜK). RTÜK, ordering Radio Garden to pay the license fee or to terminate their service in Turkey.

In late September/early October 2022, Radio Garden limited UK listeners to UK only channels. The message "Stations outside the UK temporarily unavailable" can be seen at the bottom left of the screen.

As of January 2023, a further announcement was added to the site.  It reads as follows:

"Dear listener, As you may have noticed, access to international radio stations (meaning: stations outside the United Kingdom) has been restricted for users of Radio Garden in the United Kingdom.  This restriction (due to licensing reasons) was initially referred to as a temporary measure, but unfortunately the restriction must be extended for an indefinite period due to copyright and neighbouring rights related matters that require clarification.  Considering our main goal of providing our listeners a ‘global’ radio experience, it goes without saying that we strongly regret that we had to take this step."

As a result of this restriction, UK users who opted to purchase removal of advertising were offered a refund.

References

External links

Publicly funded broadcasters
Radio in Europe
Radio in the Netherlands
Internet radio